Jeong-ja, also spelled Jung-ja, Jong-ja, or Chung-ja, is a Korean feminine given name. The meaning differs based on the hanja used to write each syllable of the name.

Hanja and meaning
There are 65 hanja with the reading "jeong" and 28 hanja with the reading "ja" on the South Korean government's official list of hanja which may be used in given names. Typically, "ja" is written with the hanja meaning "child". In Japan, where this character is read ko, it was originally used as suffix for the names of girls in the aristocracy. The practice of adding -ko to girls' names spread to the lower classes following the 1868 Meiji Restoration. Jeong-ja is one of a number of Japanese-style names ending in "ja", along with Young-ja and Soon-ja, that were popular when Korea was under Japanese rule from 1910 to 1945, but declined in popularity afterwards. According to South Korean government data, it was the sixth-most popular name for baby girls in 1940. By 1950 there were no names ending in "ja" in the top ten.

Some ways of writing this name in hanja include:

 , first hanja meaning "chastity" or "purity". The same characters correspond to a number of Japanese given names, among them various names which use kun'yomi readings of the first character, including Sadako, and another less common one Teiko which uses the on'yomi reading of the first character. 
 , first hanja meaning "correct" or "upright". The same characters correspond to various Japanese given names, including Masako (kun'yomi of first character) and Seiko (on'yomi of first character).

People
People with this name include:
Bae Jeong-ja (1870–1950), adopted daughter of Ito Hirobumi, portrayed in the film Femme Fatale: Bae Jeong-ja
Ho Jong-suk (originally Ho Jong-ja; 1908–1991), Korean independence activist, later a North Korean politician
Bak Jeong-ja (1927–2003), South Korean politician
Park Jung-ja (born 1942), actress
Lee Jung-ja (born 1951), South Korean former volleyball player  
Sin Jung-ja (born 1980), South Korean basketball player

See also
List of Korean given names

References

Korean feminine given names